Giving the Devil His Due is a 2003 compilation album of remixes and previously unreleased songs by the American nu metal band Coal Chamber.  "Blisters" and "Wishes" had been on soundtrack albums prior to this album.

Track listing

Credits
Dez Fafara - lead vocals
Meegs Rascón - guitar
Rayna Foss Rose - bass
Mike Cox - drums
John Thor - drums (on the demos)

Coal Chamber albums
2003 remix albums
Roadrunner Records remix albums